"Sledgehammer" is the season premiere of the twelfth season of the American television medical drama Grey's Anatomy, and the 246th episode overall. It aired on September 24, 2015, on ABC in the United States. The episode was written by Stacy McKee and directed by Kevin McKidd. On its initial airing the episode was watched by 9.55 million viewers and opened up to positive reviews from television critics. Earlier in April 2015, Patrick Dempsey had revealed that he would be leaving the show after the eleventh season despite having signed a contract through another season. Grey's Anatomy centers around a group of physicians struggling to balance their professional lives with their personal lives.

The episode focuses on the show's protagonist Dr. Meredith Grey's new living arrangement with her half-sister Dr. Maggie Pierce and her sister in law Dr. Amelia Shepherd in her old house after having lost her husband. Dr. Miranda Bailey fights to be the new Chief of Grey-Sloan Memorial with support from Dr. Richard Webber. Dr. Arizona Robbins and Dr. Callie Torres move on with their lives while the former looks for a new roommate. Dr. Alex Karev and Dr. Jo Wilson and Dr. Jackson Avery and Dr. April Kepner deal with their relationship problems with all the doctors trying to help two young girls who tried to commit suicide by jumping in front of a train after being bullied for being in love.

Plot
"Sledgehammer" picks up the events occurring three months after Dr. Richard Webber (James Pickens Jr.) and Dr. Catherine Avery's    (Debbie Allen) wedding. Dr. Meredith Grey (Ellen Pompeo) finds herself moving back into her old house and adjusting to life with her sister-in-law Dr. Amelia Shepherd (Caterina Scorsone) and half-sister Dr. Maggie Pierce (Kelly McCreary). Meredith awakes to a banging sound, to find Amelia putting a large hole in a non weight bearing wall with a sledgehammer. The two have an argument  on agreeing upon bringing down the wall. Maggie straddles the line between supporting either of the two.

At Grey-Sloan Memorial Hospital, after being run over by a train, two fifteen-year-old girls admit their love for each other, much to the dismay of their parents. Dr. Callie Torres (Sara Ramirez) steps in to advocate for Jessica Tanner (Mandalynn Carlson), one of the girls, which outrages her mother (Jenny Cooper), leading to a breather argument ending with Maggie punching her in the face. Nursing their critical daughters, their fathers bond and learn to accept them for who they are.

Dr. Alex Karev (Justin Chambers) and Maggie talk about being bullied as kids, with Dr. Jo Wilson (Camilla Luddington) and Callie respectively. Dr. Arizona Robbins (Jessica Capshaw) looks to rent out part of her house post her separation with Callie, but after discovering from Dr. Stephanie Edwards (Jerrika Hinton) why no one will live with her, agrees to have an intern, Andrew DeLuca (Giacomo Gianniotti), as her roommate.

Dr. Miranda Bailey (Chandra Wilson) who is vying the post of the Chief of surgery, is introduced to Dr. Tracy McConnell (Joey Lauren Adams), her competitor. Discouraged by how great Tracy is, Bailey withdraws from the race, but Dr. Ben Warren (Jason George) manages to convince her to fight for the position, which she wins after giving a mid-surgery presentation to the board. Dr. April Kepner (Sarah Drew) returns to Seattle after three months in Jordan only to find her husband Dr. Jackson Avery (Jesse Williams) to be less than warm and welcoming.

Meredith takes up teaching a new anatomy class and instructs the interns to forget everything they know about "anatomy" and start afresh. They all make the first incisions on the cadavers under her supervision. Dr. Owen Hunt (Kevin McKidd) drops Amelia at Meredith's place, and kisses her right before she is pulled in by Maggie. Meredith makes up with Amelia, and brings down the wall, and they look through it and smile.

Production

The season premiere marked the first time in the course of the show when Dempsey was not included in the list of main cast members. On the absence of the male lead of the show creator Shonda Rhimes in an interview said, "It was so interesting for me to discover that audiences, especially women, are so conditioned to believe that there’s a singular fairy tale that nobody stops to think that that might not be the definition of happiness." Rhimes continued, "Meredith knew that already. We got to the point in the season when Meredith said, 'I can live without you, but I don’t want to,' which for any woman is a very powerful statement. It means: You compliment me, but you don't complete me." ABC also pictured Grey's Anatomy without "McDreamy". The network's president has said he hopes the show will continue for years after Patrick Dempsey's alleged firing.

Pompeo in an interview with EW stated that the show would be just fine after Patrick and added that Meredith did not need a partner when other Shondaland characters — Scandal’s Olivia Pope (Kerry Washington) and How To Get Away With Murder’s Annalise Keating (Viola Davis) — lead shows on their own. She said, "Let’s keep it really real for a second and say this is really difficult for my ego" and added, "[...] somehow, Meredith Grey needs someone. Why can’t I just be the lead of the show the way Annalise and Olivia can? Why can’t I be on that poster by myself?"

It was revealed that Joey Lauren Adams will guest-star on the upcoming season of Grey's Anatomy, ABC announced Friday. As revealed in the season 11 finale, Bailey (Chandra Wilson) will be competing to be the new Chief against a candidate that Catherine Avery (Debbie Allen) chooses as reported by Entertainment Weekly can reveal that the Chasing Amy and Switched at Birth star will play Bailey's competition. Eric Lange , Maz Jobrani and Jenny Cooper co-star for the patient story involving two young girls who try to commit suicide.

Reception

Ratings
"Sledgehammer" was originally broadcast on September 24, 2015, in the United States on the American Broadcasting Company (ABC). On its initial release the episode was watched by a total of 9.55 million viewers, a decline from the previous season premiere I Must Have Lost it on the Wind which was watched by 9.81 million viewers, but was a raise from the preceding episode You're My Home which was watched by 8.33 million viewers. In the key 18-49 demographic, the episode scored a 2.8/10 in Nielsen ratings ranking at 22 in overall viewership rank and 14 in the 18-49 demographics. The premiere episode was also ranked as the 4th most watched drama.

Reviews

"Sledgehammer" was received positive reviews from television critics with the majority of them praising the direction the show had brought back and noticing that the show was familiar with earlier seasons. Writer for TVFanatic Ashley Bissette Sumerel gave the episode a 4.5/5.0 score largely praising the episode and commented positive about the show returning to its roots. Sumerel praised the storyline about two girls falling in love as she said "This is the sort of thing that makes Grey's Anatomy great. It doesn't hold back when it tackles subjects like bullying and homophobia."

Western Gazette also gave a positive review to the episode, "Within the first few minutes of the new episode, it’s clear that Grey’s Anatomy is returning to its roots. Overall, the first episode was a pleasant surprise and it was refreshing to see Rhimes head in a new direction. With Derek gone, Meredith can finally get the spotlight that she deserves without living in someone’s shadow and brings Grey’s back full circle to when we started the series." The site also gave Ellen Pompeo the credit for carrying the show saying." (It's) time for  Pompeo to finally win an Emmy."

Entertainment Weekly praised the majority of the episode saying, "Take a deep breath. Just kidding, you don’t really need to, because that episode was fun." further noting the positives, " Good for Grey’s for tackling bullies, and good for them for doing it right in the beginning of the season. Sometimes cases of the week can be, well, weak, but this one was affecting and relevant. Plus, seeing Maggie get out her inner schoolyard bully was so, so satisfying, it's good to hear more about Maggie’s life pre-Grey Sloan Memorial." for Ellen Pompeo's Meredith the site wrote, "The best line of the night goes to Meredith, who, during a conversation with Amelia about the whole wall thing, says, 'That sounds like something tequila would say.' TV's greatest relationship: Mer and tequila." and further went to add on Patrick Dempsey's absence, "This episode proved that, like Meredith said, we can live without him. Life continues on death, and so does television. So welcome back, Grey’s, and thanks for reminding us that life does indeed go on"

TVEquals praised the episode calling it a "tear-jerker" stated, "Overall, this was a great start to the twelfth season. I actually feel a bit on edge, as I wonder who among this group will have to endure heartache this season. I hope the writers will at least give Meredith and Amelia a well-earned break. I would be totally satisfied with watching Meredith, Amelia, Maggie and Callie drinking tequila and having a good time, but it wouldn’t be Grey’s Anatomy if that’s all that happened." "Heartbreaking. I love that Shondaland embraces diversity of all kinds and continues to tell stories involving LGBTQ characters."

Zap2it also praised the episode stating that the "two young girls in love have a powerful story". TVOM also praising Pompeo's character 
gave a positive review stating, "The show’s titular heroine had to learn to move forward with her life, and based on the season premiere, we would be wise to stick around for the journey. Yes we still mourn the loss of Dr. Derek Shepherd. Life moves on, and twelve seasons in, Shonda Rimes’s original sudsy drama has a strong, steady pulse."

Nad's Reviews gave a mixed to positive review to the episode review saying, "It was all fun, goofy material that managed to force a smile on my face and was entertaining all throughout. But boy was it old. Literally nothing feels fresh or original about this 'new' Grey's Anatomy. While the only medical case we had involved a touching, emotional story about two young girls in love, the whole episode just screamed predictable." The site too was positive about Pompeo saying, "And while I absolutely adore Ellen Pompeo, it’s hard to see this as Meredith’s show anymore. She gets adequate amount of screen-time and a few engaging moments, but she’s not driving this thing anymore. The whole cast is" The site also praised Debbie Allen and Chandra Wilson.

References

External links
 

Grey's Anatomy (season 12) episodes
2015 American television episodes